The 1973–74 Cleveland Cavaliers season was the fourth season of NBA basketball in Cleveland, Ohio. The Cavaliers finished the season with a 29–53 record, finishing last in the Central Division and 7th Eastern Conference. Austin Carr was named an All-Star and set the team record for points per game. The Cavaliers played, and won, their last game in Cleveland Arena.

Offseason

Trades
April 24: Cavaliers trade center Rick Roberson and forward John Johnson and switch positions in the first round of the 1973 NBA draft with the Portland Trail Blazers in exchange for the Trail Blazers' first round choice and four other draft choices. The Cavaliers select forward Jim Brewer with Portland's first pick.

Draft picks

Roster

Regular season

Season standings

Record vs. opponents

Game log

|-style="background:#fcc;"
| 1 || October 12, 1973 || Houston
| L 106–99
| Austin Carr (24)
| Brewer, Wilkens (7)
| Lenny Wilkens (7)
| Cleveland Arena3,624
| 0–1
|-style="background:#fcc;"
| 2 || October 14, 1973 || Detroit
| L 95–83
| Dwight Davis (18)
| Dwight Davis (13)
| Lenny Wilkens (8)
| Cleveland Arena2,855
| 0–2
|-style="background:#fcc;"
| 3 || October 19, 1973 || New York
| L 92–90
| Austin Carr (28)
| Jim Brewer (13)
| Lenny Wilkens (10)
| Cleveland Arena5,102
| 0–3
|-style="background:#fcc;"
| 4 || October 20, 1973 || @ Milwaukee
| L 88–101
| Austin Carr (24)
| Dwight Davis (12)
| Carr, Rule (4)
| Milwaukee Arena8,837
| 0–4
|-style="background:#ccffcc;"
| 5 || October 23, 1973 || Portland
| W 96–103
| Lenny Wilkens (30)
| Bingo Smith (15)
| Austin Carr (7)
| Cleveland Arena2,437
| 1–4
|-style="background:#fcc;"
| 6 || October 26, 1973 || N Buffalo
| L 97–104
| Dwight Davis (19)
| Dwight Davis (14)
| Lenny Wilkens (7)
| Maple Leaf Gardens7,187
| 1–5
|-style="background:#fcc;"
| 7 || October 27, 1973 || Buffalo
| L 111–101
| Austin Carr (27)
| Bob Rule (6)
| Austin Carr (7)
| Cleveland Arena4,313
| 1–6
|-style="background:#ccffcc;"
| 8 || October 28, 1973 || Boston
| W 99–102
| Austin Carr (31)
| Bob Rule (13)
| Lenny Wilkens (6)
| Cleveland Arena2,808
| 2–6
|-style="background:#fcc;"
| 9 || October 31, 1973 || @ Boston
| L 110–128
| Austin Carr (26)
| Bob Rule (7)
| Lenny Wilkens (7)
| Boston Garden4,509
| 2–7

|-style="background:#fcc;"
| 10 || November 2, 1973 || Milwaukee
| L 118–100
| Austin Carr (16)
| Jim Brewer (13)
| Lenny Wilkens (9)
| Cleveland Arena5,361
| 2–8
|-style="background:#fcc;"
| 11 || November 3, 1973 || @ Chicago
| L 94–105
| Austin Carr (26)
| Jim Brewer (14)
| Smith, Wilkens (3)
| Chicago Stadium5,733
| 2–9
|-style="background:#fcc;"
| 12 || November 4, 1973 || Atlanta
| L 115–110
| Austin Carr (31)
| Steve Patterson (10)
| Lenny Wilkens (10)
| Cleveland Arena3,587
| 2–10
|-style="background:#ccffcc;"
| 13 || November 6, 1973 || Los Angeles
| W 96–115
| Bingo Smith (22)
| Jim Brewer (16)
| Lenny Wilkens (14)
| Cleveland Arena3,124
| 3–10
|-style="background:#fcc;"
| 14 || November 9, 1973 || Houston
| W 106–111
| Bingo Smith (23)
| Jim Brewer (13)
| Lenny Wilkens (12)
| Cleveland Arena9,149
| 4–10
|-style="background:#fcc;"
| 15 || November 10, 1973 || @ New York
| L 90–100
| Austin Carr (23)
| Jim Brewer (9)
| Carr, Wilkens (6)
| Madison Square Garden18,999
| 4–11
|-style="background:#fcc;"
| 16 || November 11, 1973 || Kansas City–Omaha
| L 103–93
| Austin Carr (27)
| Steve Patterson (10)
| Lenny Wilkens (6)
| Cleveland Arena2,802
| 4–12
|-style="background:#fcc;"
| 17 || November 13, 1973 || @ Golden State
| L 115–128
| Austin Carr (23)
| Bingo Smith (11)
| Smith, Wilkens (5)
| Oakland-Alameda County Coliseum Arena2,194
| 4–13
|-style="background:#fcc;"
| 18 || November 16, 1973 || @ Seattle
| L 93–117
| Austin Carr (26)
| Dwight Davis (14)
| Lenny Wilkens (7)
| Seattle Center Coliseum11,770
| 4–14
|-style="background:#fcc;"
| 19 || November 18, 1973 || @ Los Angeles
| L 100–102
| Austin Carr (24)
| Steve Patterson (12)
| Lenny Wilkens (8)
| The Forum13,205
| 4–15
|-style="background:#ccffcc;"
| 20 || November 22, 1973 || @ Houston
| W 104–96
| Austin Carr (27)
| Steve Patterson (13)
| Carr, Wilkens (4)
| Hofheinz Pavilion4,789
| 5–15
|-style="background:#ccffcc;"
| 21 || November 23, 1973 || @ Houston
| W 85–83
| Bingo Smith (20)
| Dwight Davis (11)
| Lenny Wilkens (8)
| Hofheinz Pavilion3,653
| 6–15
|-style="background:#fcc;"
| 22 || November 25, 1973 || Boston
| L 107–101
| Austin Carr (26)
| Steve Patterson (11)
| Austin Carr (9)
| Cleveland Arena4,941
| 6–16
|-style="background:#ccffcc;"
| 23 || November 27, 1973 || Seattle
| W 118–120
| Bingo Smith (34)
| Dwight Davis (10)
| Lenny Wilkens (20)
| Cleveland Arena3,357
| 7–16
|-style="background:#ccffcc;"
| 24 || November 28, 1973 || @ Detroit
| W 96–91
| Bingo Smith (23)
| Brewer, Patterson (12)
| Lenny Wilkens (11)
| Cobo Arena2,601
| 8–16
|-style="background:#ccffcc;"
| 25 || November 30, 1973 || Philadelphia
| W 110–112
| Austin Carr (34)
| Dwight Davis (11)
| Lenny Wilkens (9)
| Cleveland Arena2,566
| 9–16

|-style="background:#ffcccc;"
| 26 || December 1, 1973 || @ New York
| L 99–119
| Lenny Wilkens (24)
| Dwight Davis (8)
| Lenny Wilkens (3)
| Madison Square Garden18,922
| 9–17
|-style="background:#ffcccc;"
| 27 || December 2, 1973 || Houston
| L 130–104
| Fred Foster (18)
| Jim Brewer (10)
| Jim Cleamons (12)
| Cleveland Arena2,354
| 9–18
|-style="background:#ccffcc;"
| 28 || December 5, 1973 || @ Philadelphia
| W 89–75
| Austin Carr (26)
| Dwight Davis (15)
| Bingo Smith (5)
| Spectrum4,230
| 10–18
|-style="background:#ffcccc;"
| 29 || December 7, 1973 || Chicago
| L 96–91
| Austin Carr (18)
| Steve Patterson (13)
| Jim Cleamons (10)
| Cleveland Arena2,868
| 10–19
|-style="background:#ffcccc;"
| 30 || December 9, 1973 || Phoenix
| L 117–106
| Austin Carr (26)
| Dwight Davis (13)
| Jim Brewer (9)
| Cleveland Arena3,042
| 10–20
|-style="background:#cfc;"
| 31 || December 11, 1973 || Los Angeles
| W 100–101 (OT)
| Austin Carr (24)
| Jim Brewer (17)
| Austin Carr (7)
| Cleveland Arena3,341
| 11–20
|-style="background:#ffcccc;"
| 32 || December 14, 1973 || Buffalo
| L 102–98
| John Warren (24)
| Dwight Davis (11)
| Bingo Smith (7)
| Cleveland Arena2,593
| 11–21
|-style="background:#ffcccc;"
| 33 || December 18, 1973 || @ Buffalo
| L 93–100
| Austin Carr (24)
| Brewer, Davis (12)
| Austin Carr (6)
| Buffalo Memorial Auditorium10,224
| 11–22
|-style="background:#ffcccc;"
| 34 || December 19, 1973 || @ Kansas City–Omaha
| L 92–106
| Carr, Cleamons (21)
| Davis, Smith (9)
| Cleamons, Smith (4)
| Omaha Civic Auditorium6,047
| 11–23
|-style="background:#cfc;"
| 35 || December 21, 1973 || Seattle
| W 96–101
| Austin Carr (30)
| Dwight Davis (10)
| Jim Brewer (8)
| Cleveland Arena2,173
| 12–23
|-style="background:#cfc;"
| 36 || December 22, 1973 || @ Atlanta
| W 108–98
| Austin Carr (39)
| Steve Patterson (10)
| Dwight Davis (7)
| The Omni5,602
| 13–23
|-style="background:#cfc;"
| 37 || December 23, 1973 || Houston
| W 91–99
| Dwight Davis (23)
| Dwight Davis (10)
| Jim Cleamons (8)
| Cleveland Arena3,074
| 14–23
|-style="background:#ffcccc;"
| 38 || December 26, 1973 || @ Milwaukee
| L 110–123
| Austin Carr (29)
| Jim Brewer (14)
| Jim Brewer (7)
| Milwaukee Arena9,986
| 14–24
|-style="background:#ffcccc;"
| 39 || December 27, 1973 || Kansas City–Omaha
| W 110–100
| Austin Carr (24)
| Dwight Davis (12)
| Austin Carr (9)
| Cleveland Arena5,417
| 14–25
|-style="background:#ffcccc;"
| 40 || December 29, 1973 || N Boston
| L 92–111
| Jim Cleamons (18)
| Dwight Davis (16)
| Jim Cleamons (5)
| Providence Civic Center6,321
| 14–26
|-style="background:#fcc;"
| 41 || December 30, 1973 || Atlanta
| L 99–94
| Austin Carr (28)
| Dwight Davis (11)
| Lenny Wilkens (6)
| Cleveland Arena6,442
| 14–27

|-style="background:#fcc;"
| 42 || January 4, 1974 || Capital
| L 94–91
| Austin Carr (22)
| Brewer, Davis, Smith (9)
| Lenny Wilkens (7)
| Cleveland Arena3,431
| 14–28
|-style="background:#fcc;"
| 43 || January 5, 1974 || @ Atlanta
| L 86–99
| Austin Carr (15)
| Dwight Davis (8)
| Jim Cleamons (5)
| The Omni7,370
| 14–29
|-style="background:#fcc;"
| 44 || January 9, 1974 || @ Philadelphia
| L 86–90
| Dwight Davis (16)
| Luke Witte (11)
| Jim Cleamons (5)
| Spectrum2,545
| 14–30
|-style="background:#fcc;"
| 45 || January 11, 1974 || Detroit
| L 106–96
| Austin Carr (25)
| Smith, Witte (8)
| Austin Carr (7)
| Cleveland Arena4,208
| 14–31
|-style="background:#ccffcc;"
| 46 || January 12, 1974 || @ Detroit
| W 117–112 (OT)
| Austin Carr (27)
| Dwight Davis (16)
| Lenny Wilkens (9)
| Cobo Arena5,644
| 15–31
|-style="background:#ccffcc;"
| 47 || January 13, 1974 || Philadelphia
| W 94–96
| Austin Carr (26)
| Dwight Davis (8)
| Lenny Wilkens (11)
| Cleveland Arena3,477
| 16–31
|-style="background:#fcc;"
| 48 || January 17, 1974 || @ Capital
| L 86–101
| Austin Carr (22)
| Dwight Davis (7)
| Lenny Wilkens (8)
| Capital Centre3,217
| 16–32
|-style="background:#fcc;"
| 49 || January 19, 1974 || @ Kansas City–Omaha
| L 108–111
| Austin Carr (31)
| Dwight Davis (16)
| Lenny Wilkens (6)
| Kemper Arena5,538
| 16–33
|-style="background:#ccffcc;"
| 50 || January 22, 1974 || @ Los Angeles
| W 111–110 (OT)
| Lenny Wilkens (24)
| Brewer, Witte (13)
| Lenny Wilkens (10)
| The Forum13,856
| 17–33
|-style="background:#fcc;"
| 51 || January 23, 1974 || @ Phoenix
| L 103–110
| Bingo Smith (20)
| Luke Witte (12)
| Lenny Wilkens (13)
| Arizona Veterans Memorial Coliseum5,017
| 17–34
|-style="background:#ccffcc;"
| 52 || January 25, 1974 || @ Portland
| W 87–84
| Bingo Smith (20)
| Steve Patterson (9)
| Lenny Wilkens (6)
| Memorial Coliseum8,484
| 18–34
|-style="background:#fcc;"
| 53 || January 26, 1974 || @ Golden State
| L 93–106
| Bingo Smith (22)
| Luke Witte (11)
| Lenny Wilkens (7)
| Oakland-Alameda County Coliseum Arena4,687
| 18–35
|-style="background:#cfc;"
| 54 || January 29, 1974 || Atlanta
| W 111–118
| Bingo Smith (27)
| Steve Patterson (12)
| Lenny Wilkens (10)
| Cleveland Arena4,453
| 19–35
|-style="background:#fcc;"
| 55 || January 30, 1974 || @ Boston
| L 108–120
| Lenny Wilkens (24)
| Steve Patterson (11)
| Lenny Wilkens (8)
| Boston Garden5,970
| 19–36

|-style="background:#fcc;"
| 56 || February 1, 1974 || Capital
| L 107–99
| Austin Carr (28)
| Dwight Davis (11)
| Cleamons, Wilkens (9)
| Cleveland Arena3,735
| 19–37
|-style="background:#fcc;"
| 57 || February 2, 1974 || @ New York
| L 87–103
| Austin Carr (18)
| Patterson, Witte (9)
| Lenny Wilkens (4)
| Madison Square Garden19,694
| 19–38
|-style="background:#fcc;"
| 58 || February 3, 1974 || Chicago
| L 108–94
| Steve Patterson (17)
| Steve Patterson (15)
| Lenny Wilkens (11)
| Cleveland Arena3,406
| 19–39
|-style="background:#fcc;"
| 59 || February 5, 1974 || Milwaukee
| L 102–87
| Lenny Wilkens (18)
| Dwight Davis (12)
| Lenny Wilkens (9)
| Cleveland Arena5,291
| 19–40
|-style="background:#fcc;"
| 60 || February 8, 1974 || @ Houston
| L 106–120
| Austin Carr (22)
| Steve Patterson (16)
| Steve Patterson (10)
| Hofheinz Pavilion4,237
| 19–41
|-style="background:#fcc;"
| 61 || February 9, 1974 || @ Atlanta
| L 90–99
| Austin Carr (24)
| Steve Patterson (14)
| Lenny Wilkens (7)
| The Omni5,534
| 19–42
|-style="background:#ccffcc;"
| 62 || February 10, 1974 || Buffalo
| W 121–125
| Austin Carr (35)
| Steve Patterson (10)
| Fred Foster (8)
| Cleveland Arena2,997
| 20–42
|-style="background:#fcc;"
| 63 || February 12, 1974 || Capital
| L 107–99
| Lenny Wilkens (22)
| Steve Patterson (18)
| Steve Patterson (6)
| Cleveland Arena3,549
| 20–43
|-style="background:#ccffcc;"
| 64 || February 16, 1974 || @ Portland
| W 106–101
| Steve Patterson (22)
| Steve Patterson (19)
| Lenny Wilkens (10)
| Memorial Coliseum5,583
| 21–43
|-style="background:#fcc;"
| 65 || February 17, 1974 || @ Seattle
| L 97–106
| Lenny Wilkens (25)
| Steve Patterson (14)
| Lenny Wilkens (7)
| Seattle Center Coliseum14,078
| 21–44
|-style="background:#fcc;"
| 66 || February 19, 1974 || Golden State
| L 104–98
| Austin Carr (34)
| Steve Patterson (11)
| Lenny Wilkens (11)
| Cleveland Arena2,946
| 21–45
|-style="background:#fcc;"
| 67 || February 21, 1974 || Golden State
| L 122–103
| Austin Carr (26)
| Steve Patterson (16)
| Lenny Wilkens (6)
| Cleveland Arena1,641
| 21–46
|-style="background:#fcc;"
| 68 || February 22, 1974 || New York
| L 117–110
| Austin Carr (32)
| Jim Cleamons (8)
| Lenny Wilkens (6)
| Cleveland Arena7,781
| 21–47
|-style="background:#ccffcc;"
| 69 || February 23, 1974 || @ Capital
| W 104–101
| Austin Carr (28)
| Dwight Davis (11)
| Lenny Wilkens (8)
| Capital Centre9,247
| 22–47
|-style="background:#ccffcc;"
| 70 || February 24, 1974 || Phoenix
| W 97–101
| Lenny Wilkens (19)
| Steve Patterson (11)
| Carr, Wilkens (6)
| Cleveland Arena3,288
| 23–47

|-style="background:#cfc;"
| 71 || March 1, 1974 || @ Philadelphia
| W 110–93
| Austin Carr (28)
| Barry Clemens (17)
| Lenny Wilkens (7)
| Spectrum3,852
| 24–47
|-style="background:#ffcccc;"
| 72 || March 3, 1974 || @ Capital
| L 93–98
| Austin Carr (24)
| Brewer, Patterson (13)
| Lenny Wilkens (6)
| Capital Centre5,072
| 24–48
|-style="background:#ffcccc;"
| 73 || March 9, 1974 || @ Phoenix
| L 100–109
| Austin Carr (16)
| Dwight Davis (10)
| Lenny Wilkens (7)
| Arizona Veterans Memorial Coliseum6,153
| 24–49
|-style="background:#ffcccc;"
| 74 || March 10, 1974 || @ Houston
| L 108–113
| Austin Carr (32)
| Steve Patterson (9)
| Lenny Wilkens (10)
| Hofheinz Pavilion2,054
| 24–50
|-style="background:#cfc;"
| 75 || March 12, 1974 || Atlanta
| W 84–95
| Carr, Smith (24)
| Steve Patterson (18)
| Lenny Wilkens (9)
| Cleveland Arena4,514
| 25–50
|-style="background:#cfc;"
| 76 || March 15, 1974 || Boston
| W 103–104
| Lenny Wilkens (24)
| Dwight Davis (9)
| Austin Carr (6)
| Cleveland Arena7,304
| 26–50
|-style="background:#ffcccc;"
| 77 || March 16, 1974 || @ Buffalo
| L 105–114
| Lenny Wilkens (18)
| Steve Patterson (7)
| Jim Cleamons (5)
| Buffalo Memorial Auditorium18,000
| 26–51
|-style="background:#cfc;"
| 78 || March 17, 1974 || Philadelphia
| W 99–115
| Austin Carr (31)
| Steve Patterson (15)
| Lenny Wilkens (14)
| Cleveland Arena2,891
| 27–51
|-style="background:#cfc;"
| 79 || March 19, 1974 || Portland
| W 103–107
| Bingo Smith (24)
| Steve Patterson (16)
| Lenny Wilkens (6)
| Cleveland Arena3,379
| 28–51
|-style="background:#ffcccc;"
| 80 || March 20, 1974 || @ Capital
| L 91–101
| Lenny Wilkens (26)
| Steve Patterson (13)
| Lenny Wilkens (9)
| Capital Centre7,943
| 28–52
|-style="background:#cfc;"
| 81 || March 24, 1974 || New York
| W 92–114
| Lenny Wilkens (22)
| Davis, Patterson (8)
| Lenny Wilkens (11)
| Cleveland Arena8,829
| 29–52
|-style="background:#ffcccc;"
| 82 || March 26, 1974 || @ Chicago
| L 98–104
| Carr, Smith (22)
| Davis, Patterson (8)
| Austin Carr (6)
| Chicago Stadium5,327
| 29–53

References

 Cleveland Cavaliers on Database Basketball
 Cleveland Cavaliers on Basketball Reference

Cleveland
Cleveland Cavaliers seasons
Cleveland
Cleveland